Papa Bois (otherwise known as "Maître Bois", meaning master of the woods or "Daddy Bouchon" meaning hairy man), a French patois word for "father wood" or "father of the forest" is a popular fictional folklore character of St. Lucia and Trinidad and Tobago. Often called the "keeper of the forest", he is thought of as the protector of the forests and their flora and fauna.

He is married to the Mama Dlo also known as Mama D'Leau.

His appearance is thought to be that of a short, old man of African descent with cloven hooves (or at least his left leg ends in a large hoof) and a beard of leaves, who, despite his age sports strong muscles and can run faster than a deer. His body is completely covered with hair like that of a donkey and small horns sprout from his forehead. He is also known to carry a hollowed-out bull's horn, which he uses to warn animals of hunters' approach. He is also known to have the power of metamorphosis and is commonly thought to transform himself into a deer, luring hunters deep into the forest and getting them lost. Much like his female counterpart, Mama Dlo.

It is believed that if one meets Papa Bois, one must be polite and refrain from staring at his hooves, and say a polite greeting to him. For example, "Bon jour, vieux Papa" meaning, "Good day, old father." 
Papa Bois is also found in Grenadian folklore.  He is usually represented as a huge Manicou (Opossum).  Hunters of the forest are always afraid of him because of his appearing and disappearing trick.

In popular culture
 In Nalo Hopkinson's book Midnight Robber, Papa Bois is the name of the large "daddy trees" that function as both shelter and ecosystem for sentient creatures.

See also
Douen
Gang Gang Sarah

References

External links
 Trinidad and Tobago Folklore Characters
 Papa Bois Article

Caribbean legendary creatures
Trinidad and Tobago folklore